Darious Williams (born March 15, 1993) is an American football cornerback for the Jacksonville Jaguars of the National Football League (NFL). He played college football at UAB. After signing as an undrafted free agent with the Baltimore Ravens, Williams went on to join the Los Angeles Rams, where he won a championship with the team during Super Bowl LVI.

Early life and high school
Williams was born and grew up in Jacksonville, Florida. He originally attended Bartram Trail High School before transferring to Creekside High School after his freshman year. He played basketball, football and ran track at Creekside.

College career
Williams played one season at D-III Marietta College in Ohio before leaving after the season due to family issues. He then enrolled at the University of Alabama at Birmingham for the spring semester and originally was turned down after a tryout to join the football team as a walk-on. He made the team as a walk-on in 2014 under new head coach Bill Clark and was awarded a scholarship midway through the season. After UAB dropped football after the season, Williams attended Florida State College at Jacksonville and worked as a flower delivery man until UAB brought back the program in June 2015, turning down several offers to transfer.

Over the course of two seasons with the Blazers, Williams played in 25 games (18 starts), recording 73 tackles, 26 passes defenced and 6 interceptions (two returned for a touchdown). He was named first-team All-Conference USA and named a first-team All-American by Pro Football Focus during for the 2017 season after making 50 tackles with a conference leading 15 passes broken up and five interceptions (fourth in the nation).

Professional career

Baltimore Ravens
Williams went undrafted in the 2018 NFL Draft. On May 4, 2018, the Baltimore Ravens signed Williams to a three-year, $1.71 million contract as an undrafted free agent.

Throughout training camp, Williams competed for a roster spot as a backup cornerback against Stanley Jean-Baptiste and Bennett Jackson. Head coach John Harbaugh named Williams the seventh backup cornerback on the depth chart to start his rookie season, behind Brandon Carr, Jimmy Smith, Marlon Humphrey, Anthony Averett, Maurice Canady, and Tavon Young.
He made his NFL debut on September 13, 2018, against the Cincinnati Bengals, playing on special teams. On October 6, 2018, the Baltimore Ravens waived Williams after Jimmy Smith returned from his four-game suspension.

Los Angeles Rams
On October 8, 2018, Williams was claimed off waivers by the Los Angeles Rams. Head coach Sean McVay named Williams the sixth cornerback on the depth chart, behind Marcus Peters, Sam Shields, Nickell Robey-Coleman, Troy Hill, and Dominique Hatfield. He remained on the Rams roster for the rest of the 2018, appearing in one game. Williams made the Rams 53-man roster out of training camp the next season. He scored his first NFL touchdown on October 20, 2019, against the Atlanta Falcons, recovering a fumble in the end zone on a punt return. The game was also the first start of his career at cornerback. Williams recorded his first career interception, picking off a tipped pass by Jimmy Garoppolo, on December 21, 2019, in his second career start against the San Francisco 49ers. In the following week's game against the Arizona Cardinals, Williams intercepted a pass thrown by Kyler Murray during the 31–24 win. Williams played in 14 games during the 2019 season, starting three and finishing the year with 15 tackles, four passes defended, two interceptions and a fumble recovery for a touchdown.

In Week 2 of the 2020 season against the Philadelphia Eagles, Williams recorded his first interception of the season off a pass thrown by Carson Wentz during the 37–19 win. In Week 4 against the New York Giants, Williams recorded an interception off a pass thrown by Daniel Jones late in the fourth quarter to secure a 17–9 Rams’ win. In Week 10 against the Seattle Seahawks he picked off Russell Wilson twice and also broke up a third pass in the end zone. In the Wild Card Round of the playoffs against the Seattle Seahawks, Williams intercepted another pass thrown by Russell Wilson and returned it for a 42-yard touchdown during the 30–20 win.

On March 15, 2021, the Rams placed a first-round restricted free agent tender on Williams. He signed the one-year contract on April 21. He suffered an ankle injury in Week 5 and was placed on injured reserve on October 12. He was activated on November 6. Williams helped the Rams win Super Bowl LVI against the Cincinnati Bengals. He recorded 8 tackles in the game.

Jacksonville Jaguars
On March 16, 2022, Williams signed a three-year, $30 million contract with the Jacksonville Jaguars.

References

External links
UAB Blazers bio
Los Angeles Rams bio

1994 births
Living people
Players of American football from Jacksonville, Florida
American football cornerbacks
Marietta Pioneers football players
UAB Blazers football players
Baltimore Ravens players
Los Angeles Rams players
Jacksonville Jaguars players